Baby on Baby 2 is the fourth studio album by American rapper DaBaby. It was released through Interscope Records and South Coast Music Group on September 23, 2022. The album features a sole guest appearance from Anthony Hamilton. It serves as a sequel to DaBaby's debut studio album, Baby on Baby (2019). The album was projected to earn significantly less units in its first week than DaBaby's previous album Blame It on Baby (2020), with both DaBaby himself and rapper Meek Mill claiming that DaBaby had been "blackballed".

Critical reception
TiVo Staff from AllMusic criticized that the material on Baby on Baby 2 "begins to feel one-dimensional and interchangeable." and also concluded "As ever, the songs here are energetic and fun, but ultimately feel a little disposable, with DaBaby's work becoming more and more like a particular and brawny mood than any specific creative statement."

Background and promotion
In July 2022, DaBaby was interviewed by Canadian-American YouTube channel Nelk's Full Send Podcast, in which he revealed the title of the album and announced an initial release for the beginning of the next month, which did not happen for unknown reasons. On September 22, 2022, he shared its cover art and release date for the following day.

Commercial performance
Baby on Baby 2 debuted at number 34 on the US Billboard 200 chart with around 17,000 album equivalent units.

Track listing

Notes
 signifies a co-producer

Charts

References

2022 albums
DaBaby albums
Interscope Records albums
Albums produced by JetsonMade